The NCAA Season 80 basketball tournaments are the postseason tournaments of the National Collegiate Athletic Association for basketball at the 2004–05 season. The tournaments are divided into two divisions: the Juniors tournament for male high school students and the Seniors tournament for male college students.

The NCAA ushered its 80th season on June 26, 2004 before a packed crowd at the Araneta Coliseum. Ricky Palou is the year's NCAA commissioner, the opening rites were graced by the NCAA board members and other representatives of member schools. 

Philippine Christian University bag their first-ever NCAA crown since joining the league eight years ago. The Dolphins swept the University of Perpetual Help Altas.

Seniors' tournament

Elimination round

Match-up results

Scores
Results on top and to the right of the dashes are for first-round games; those to the bottom and to the left of it are second-round games.

Fourth seed playoff

San Beda, Mapua and San Sebastian wound up in a three-way tie at the end of the elimination round. However, only the Red Lions and the Cardinals will figure in a knockout match due to their superior tie-break quotients. 

San Beda made it to the final four cast for the first time in seven years as they relied on their tested leader Arjun Cordero, who shot nine of his 14 points in the final four minutes to lift the Red Lions past the Mapua Cardinals.

Bracket
*Game went into overtime

Semifinals
PCU and Perpetual Help have the twice-to-beat advantage. They only have to win once, while their opponents, twice, to progress.

Perpetual vs. San Beda

In Game 1, Jeff Bombeo and rookie Yousif Aljamal combined for 25 points to lift the Red Lions past the Altas, who were playing without key player Vladimir Joe.

PCU vs. Letran

Jonathan Aldave nailed a three-pointer with 3.2 seconds left to stun the PCU Dolphins in Game 1. After Robert Sanz drained his charities in the last 12 seconds for a 64-62 PCU lead, the Knights' Boyet Bautista dribbled the length of the court, drove down the middle to draw the defense to him and made a kick-off pass to the waiting Aldave, who delivered the night's most dramatic basket.

Finals
A historic NCAA basketball series unfolds when University of Perpetual Help Altas and Philippine Christian University Dolphins vie for their first championship crown. The Dolphins are in their first finals appearance since joining the league in 1996 while the Altas will troop to the championship match for the first time in 15 years. 

Finals Most Valuable Player: 

Sophomore Jayson Castro drain a three-pointer with five seconds left in Game 1 as the Dolphins moved to within a win of capturing their first-ever NCAA crown. Head coach Loreto Tolentino was slapped with a one-game suspension for excessive complaining in their previous semifinal win against Letran. Tolentino's son Elvis called the shots for PCU on the bench.

In Game 2, PCU posted a double-digit lead right from the first quarter and delivered the best first half they could play. The Dolphins dictated the tempo with Robert Sanz and rookie Jayson Castro leading the charge, and Gabby Espinas coming off the bench. PCU coach Loreto Tolentino steered the Dolphins in one of the most amazing turnarounds the league has ever seen. Robert Sanz bagged the Finals MVP award. Before the game, Espinas was awarded both the season Most Valuable Player and Rookie of the Year awards, the first player to win both awards in the league on the same season.

Awards
NCAA Individual awards
Most Valuable Player:  
Rookie of the Year:  
Mythical Five:
 
 
 
 
 
Defensive Player of the Year: 
Most Improved Player:  
Coach of the Year:

Juniors tournament

Bracket

Semifinals

San Beda vs. LSGH

Letran vs. PCU

Finals 

Finals Most Valuable Player: 
In Game 2, Squires star Lucas Tagarda carried his team in the end game, as he made six of his 15 points in the final minute of the game, as Letran forced a winner-take-all Game Three.

In the deciding game, Red Cubs team captain Ogie Menor exploded for 30 points and 20 rebounds, while teammates James Martinez and Jay-R Taganas added 15 and 8 points respectively, as they clinched the NCAA juniors championship.

Awards 
NCAA Individual Awards
 Most Valuable Player: 
 Rookie of the Year: 
 Mythical Five:
 
 
 
 
 
 Defensive Player of the Year: 
 Most Improved Player: 
 Coach of the Year:

See also 
 UAAP Season 67 men's basketball tournament

References

80
2004–05 in Philippine basketball